The 2022 SEC Championship Game was a college football game played on December 3, 2022, at Mercedes-Benz Stadium in Atlanta, Georgia. It was the 31st edition of the SEC Championship Game and determined  the champion of the Southeastern Conference (SEC) for the 2022 season. The game began at 4:00 p.m. EST on CBS. The contest featured the LSU Tigers, the West Division champions and the Georgia Bulldogs of the East Division.

Teams

LSU Tigers

The Tigers clinched a spot in the game following Alabama's defeat of Ole Miss on November 12. Earlier in the season, LSU had defeated both Alabama and Ole Miss. LSU's last appearance, and victory, in the game was in 2019.

Georgia Bulldogs 

Georgia began the season as the No. 3 ranked team in both the AP and Coaches Polls. In the Chick-Fil-A Kickoff Game, Georgia defeated No. 11 Oregon 49–3. The following week, after jumping to No. 2 in both polls, Georgia defeated No. 25-FCS-ranked Samford 33–0. Georgia would jump to No. 1 in the AP Poll before defeating South Carolina 48–7 on the road. Georgia would return to Athens as the No. 1 team in both polls. Georgia would go on to defeat Kent State 39–22. The following week at Missouri, Georgia would trail 12–22 in the fourth quarter. After 14 unanswered points, Georgia would win the game 26–22. Georgia would return home for a two game home stretch including victories over rivals Auburn and Vanderbilt before a bye week. Following the bye week, Georgia would defeat Florida 42–20. During the game, Nolan Smith would tear a pectoral muscle, prematurely ending his season. Georgia would remain No. 1 in the AP and Coaches Polls, but was ranked No. 3 in the inaugural College Football Playoff rankings. In the game of the century, Georgia defeated Tennessee 27–13. The following week, Georgia clinched a spot in the SEC Championship with a 45–19 victory over Mississippi State.

Game summaries

Statistics

References

Championship Game
SEC Championship Game
Georgia Bulldogs football games
LSU Tigers football games
SEC Championship Game
SEC Championship Game
SEC Championship Game